Osvaldo Rodríguez may refer to:
 Osvaldo Rodríguez (poet) (1943–1996), Chilean poet
 Osvaldo Rodríguez (musician), Cuban musician
 Osvaldo Rodríguez (footballer, born 1990), Costa Rican footballer
 Osvaldo Rodríguez (footballer, born 1996), Mexican footballer